Emoia kordoana, also known as Meyer's emo skink, is a species of skink. It is found in New Guinea, the Admiralty Islands, the Bismarck Archipelago, and Sulawesi.

References

Emoia
Reptiles of Indonesia
Skinks of New Guinea
Reptiles of Papua New Guinea
Reptiles described in 1874
Taxa named by Adolf Bernhard Meyer